Gelson Domingos da Silva (c. 1965 – 6 November 2011), a Brazilian camera operator for the Rede Bandeirantes TV network, died while covering a drug bust in Rio de Janeiro as the government of Brazil prepared for its hosting of Olympics. Domingos was the first Brazilian journalist to die in this type of crime setting in Brazil.

Personal Information
Domingos was 46 years old at the time of his death. He was married to Fabiana Domingo, and the couple had three children and 2 grandchildren at the time of his death. He was buried at the Memorial do Carmo, in Caju.

Career
Domingos was a TV camera operator for the radio and TV group Rede Bandeirantes, which is often referred to as TV Band for short. He was considered by the press freedom organizations to be a veteran and had previously worked at the Brazilian Television System, or Sistema Brasileiro de Televisão (SBT), and the Record.

Death
Domingos was shot in the chest by a high caliber bullet and killed while covering a drug raid at the Antares favela. on the west side of Rio de Janeiro. What began that morning as a raid turned into a fierce shootout between the 80 military-trained soldiers who conducted the operation and the drug traffickers. Although Domingos was protected by a bullet proof vest during the operation, it was not of the strong quality that was used by the authorities. It is against Brazilian law for media personnel or others to wear the high-tech protection vests that the police and military wear. Police arrested 9 suspects, which included a minor, and believed that one of them was the gunman who killed Domingos, but four other suspects were killed, and it may have been one of them who killed Domingos. Police will be reviewing the video taken by Domingos to determine the killer. Afterwards police seized marijuana, cocaine, communications equipment and a weapons cache from the site.

The operation began at 6:30 a.m. and Domingos was dead on arrival at the hospital at 7:40 a.m. Ernani Alves was the reporter who was working with Domingos for a TV Band report.

Context
The Brazilian authorities have been conducting more of these crime sweep operations, especially around the sports facilities, because Brazil is preparing for the FIFA World Cup in 2014  and the World Olympics that will be held 2 years afterwards.

Reactions
The military expressed its regret that the Brazilian camera operator died during the raid.
Brazilian Association of Investigative Journalism said the authorities should be responsible for protecting journalists who cover their operations. The union of journalists, however, blamed TV Band: "Bullet-proof vests are not safe against the weapons used by the drug traffickers and police," said the union's leader.

Reporters Without Borders said, "Security policy feeds on media coverage and this dependence is fraught with risks for journalists working in the favelas, where some of them also live. The security of all concerned – journalists, witnesses and residents – takes priority over a results-based culture or a drive for image."

Awards
 2009 Vladimir Herzog Award (Vladimir Herzog de Anistia e Direitos Humanos) for a TV Documentary about murders in northern Brazil.

References

External links 
 Memorial website

1965 births
2011 deaths
Brazilian television journalists
Crime journalists
Journalists killed in Brazil
Writers from Rio de Janeiro (city)
Murdered journalists